In enzymology, a phosphomethylpyrimidine kinase is an enzyme that catalyzes the chemical reaction

ATP + (4-amino-2-methylpyrimidin-5-yl)methyl phosphate  ADP + (4-amino-2-methylpyrimidin-5-yl)methyl diphosphate

Thus, the two substrates of this enzyme are ATP and (4-amino-2-methylpyrimidin-5-yl)methyl phosphate, whereas its two products are ADP and (4-amino-2-methylpyrimidin-5-yl)methyl diphosphate.

This enzyme belongs to the family of transferases, to be specific, those transferring phosphorus-containing groups (phosphotransferases) with a phosphate group as acceptor.  The systematic name of this enzyme class is ATP:(4-amino-2-methylpyrimidin-5-yl)methyl-phosphate phosphotransferase. Other names in common use include hydroxymethylpyrimidine phosphokinase, and ATP:4-amino-2-methyl-5-phosphomethylpyrimidine phosphotransferase.  This enzyme participates in thiamine metabolism.

Structural studies

References

 

EC 2.7.4
Enzymes of known structure